The 1856 United States presidential election in South Carolina took place on November 4, 1856, as part of the 1856 United States presidential election. The state legislature chose 8 representatives, or electors to the Electoral College, who voted for president and vice president.

South Carolina cast 8 electoral votes for the Democratic candidate James Buchanan. These electors were chosen by the South Carolina General Assembly, the state legislature, rather than by popular vote.

Results

References

South Carolina
1856
1856 South Carolina elections